Rurrenabaque is a small town in the north of Bolivia on the Beni River. It is the capital of Rurrenabaque Municipality. In recent years it has become popular with international tourism as it is an easy gateway for visits to Madidi National Park (within the Bolivian rainforest), as well as the surrounding pampas. Locals commonly refer to the town by its shortened nickname, "Rurre."

Rurrenabaque is located in José Ballivián Province in Beni Department, Bolivia. Rurrenabaque Municipality, the fourth municipal section of José Ballivián Province, had 19,195 inhabitants as of 2012, of which 13,446 lived in urban Rurrenabaque itself.

Transportation

Rurrenabaque is reached by bus,  from La Paz (18 hours), by hired taxi (12 hours) or by airplane (45 minutes-1 hour). Amaszonas have flights to Rurrenabaque. Ecojet offers flights to Cochabamba.

The buses from La Paz pass through Coroico,  from La Paz.
A new road on this route opened at the end of 2006, decreasing most motorized traffic on the older, more dangerous Yungas Road, also known as 'Death Road,' now highly popular for mountain bike tours.

Rurrenabaque Airport was paved in 2010. Sometimes, low clouds over nearby mountains can hinder planes' visibility and can prevent planes from landing.

There are no mountains near Reyes, and the airport often has better weather and fewer low clouds. Reyes is the capital of José Ballivián Province in the Beni Department.

Rurrenabaque lies on the east bank of the Beni River. A bridge over the Beni River connects with the town of San Buenaventura on the west bank. The bridge is a part of a regional road project, promoted as a way to improve the economic relationship between the two towns, which had been described as stunted because of limited and expensive transport by boat. An argument in favor of the proposed bridge is that the shallows and strong currents at the San Buenaventura section limit the types of boats and motors capable of crossing the stretch of river, representing an investment beyond the means of most individual Bolivian families; a bridge would allow San Buenaventura to enjoy the same accessibility as that enjoyed between Rurrenabaque and the neighboring town of Reyes. Researchers cite economic and social harm for the area because of environmental damage from the road project and the location of the bridge, which may reduce the town's appeal as a destination/gateway for eco-tourists.

Climate

Rurrenabaque sits on the Beni River as the waterway exits the Andean folds of western Bolivia into the Llanos de Moxos. The city has a tropical rainforest climate bordering on a tropical monsoon climate with a noticeably drier part of the year. Rurrenabaque, like much of Bolivia, is subject to annual climactic variation, particularly as a result of climate change.

Tourism

From Rurrenabaque popular tours go to the jungle/rainforest ("selva" in Spanish) and to the pampas. The jungle/rainforest is south and west of Rurrenabaque (including a part of the Madidi National Park), and the tours leave by boat and foot. There are many tour agencies in the town offering similar tours.

Rurrenabaque is a starting point for ecotourism, and some eco-lodges are found in the area. The following is a list of the community based Eco-Lodges-: Mashaquipe; San Louis Grande (Mosetén); Berraco del Madidi (Quechua-Tacanas); San Miguel del Bala (Tacanas); Chalalán (Quechua-Tacanas); Mapajo (Tsiman-Mosetén).

Events, festivities: 2 February: Fiesta de Rurre - Anniversary of Rurrenabaque - The day of La Virgen de Candelaria.

External links

References

Populated places in Beni Department